Nikki I. Lucas (born June 20, 1970) is an American politician, activist, and management consultant serving as a member of the New York State Assembly from the 60th district. She assumed office on February 17, 2022.

Education 
Lucas earned an Associate of Arts degree in liberal arts from the Borough of Manhattan Community College and a Bachelor of Arts degree in policy studies and conflict resolution from Syracuse University.

Career 
Outside of politics, Lucas has worked as a management consultant. She also operated a music store in East New York, Brooklyn and was a recruiter for the United States Census Bureau from 2007 to 2011. Lucas was a candidate for the New York City Council in 2017 but did not appear on the ballot. She was elected to the New York State Assembly in a February 2022 special election.

References 

African-American state legislators in New York (state)
Living people
Democratic Party members of the New York State Assembly
Borough of Manhattan Community College alumni
Syracuse University alumni
People from East New York, Brooklyn
1970 births